Andrew Rankin Cowie McLellan  is a minister in the Church of Scotland. He was Her Majesty's Chief Inspector of Prisons for Scotland from 2002 to 2009.

He was educated at Kilmarnock Academy, Madras College (St Andrews), the University of St Andrews, the University of Glasgow and Union Theological Seminary, New York City, USA.

He was Assistant Minister at St George's West Church, Edinburgh, 1969–1971. Thereafter, he was Minister at Cartsburn Augustine Church, Greenock (1971–1980) (and was also an elected member of Inverclyde District Council 1977–1980), Viewfield Parish Church, Stirling (1980–1986) and St Andrew's and St George's Church, Edinburgh (1986–2002). He was Convener of the Church of Scotland's Church and Nation Committee 1992-1996 its Parish Development Fund 2002 – 2006, and its World Mission Council 2010–2014; and Moderator of the General Assembly of the Church of Scotland in 2000. He was Chaplain of the Boys' Brigade (UK and ROI) 2013- 2016. He is also author of two books.

He is married to Irene and has twin sons Andi and Ian.  He now lives in Dunfermline. His formal title (following the end of his Moderatorial year) is the Very Reverend Dr Andrew McLellan.

McLellan was appointed commander of the Order of the British Empire (CBE) in the 2009 Birthday Honours.

He was the chairman of what became known as the McLellan Commission into a range of safeguarding initiatives for the Scottish Catholic Church (2013-2015). This commission was announced by Scotland's Catholic Bishops, known as the Bishops' Conference of Scotland, in November 2013; it published its report, the McLellan Report, on 18 August 2015. The commission investigated child sex abuse by Scotland's priests, acknowledging in section 2.1 of the Report that "There is no doubt that abuse of the most serious kind has taken place within the Catholic Church in Scotland", and the Church's responses. Kevin McKenna said in The Observer that the Report was "a whitewash ... So soft and fluffy ... that it should have been delivered with a big pink ribbon tied around it and pictures of Walt Disney characters on its cover". Catherine Deveney had been more supportive, writing in the same newspaper "McLellan had promised a report that was neither timid nor deferential. He delivered it", but adding that repentance and action were now needed, and that the Church's apology would ring hollow until its public words matched their private actions. Catholic weekly The Tablet said the Report was "a masterpiece of its kind that deserves to be studied", and "a vote of no confidence in the Scottish bishops' safeguarding procedures".

In 2017 McLellan was appointed chair of the Scottish Prison Visitor Centre Steering Group.

Footnotes

See also
Church of Scotland
List of Moderators of the General Assembly of the Church of Scotland
Her Majesty's Chief Inspector of Prisons (England and Wales)

External links
Website of HM Inspectorate of Prisons for Scotland
Article in The Herald newspaper (Glasgow), 15 April 2008

Alumni of the University of St Andrews
Alumni of the University of Glasgow
Moderators of the General Assembly of the Church of Scotland
People associated with Inverclyde
Commanders of the Order of the British Empire
Living people
British prison inspectors
People educated at Madras College
Year of birth missing (living people)